The 1939–40 Northern Football League season was the 47th in the history of the Northern Football League, a football competition in Northern England.

Clubs

The league originally featured 12 clubs which competed in the last season, along with two new clubs:
 Heaton Stannington
 Brandon Social 

The initial competition was abandoned on 16 December 1939 after Whitby United, Evenwood Town, Brandon Social, Billingham, Cockfield, and Ferryhill Athletic resigned from the league between 30 September and 16 December. The remaining eight clubs agreed to begin a new competition beginning on 1 January 1940.

League table

References

1939-40
4